Father Steps Out may refer to:

 Father Steps Out (1937 film), a British comedy starring Dinah Sheridan
 Father Steps Out (1941 film), an American comedy